John Alexander Douglas McCurdy , (2 August 1886 – 25 June 1961) was a Canadian aviation pioneer and the 20th Lieutenant Governor of Nova Scotia from 1947 to 1952.

Early years 
Son of inventor Arthur Williams McCurdy and born in Baddeck, Nova Scotia, McCurdy was known as "Douglas". He was schooled at St. Andrew's College in Aurora, Ontario and graduated from the University of Toronto in mechanical engineering in 1907, where he had been a member of The Kappa Alpha Society along with his friend Frederick Walker Baldwin. The University of Toronto Year Book for his graduation year (Torontonensis 1907) shows that he was active in rugby and fencing.

Aviation 
In 1907, he joined Alexander Graham Bell's Aerial Experiment Association. In 1908, McCurdy helped another AEA member, Glenn Curtiss to set up the Curtiss Aeroplane and Motor Company.

McCurdy became the first British subject to fly an aircraft in the British Empire when he piloted the Aerial Experiment Association's Silver Dart off the ice of Bras d'Or Lake in Nova Scotia. The Silver Dart was the first powered aircraft to fly in Canada. In 1910, he was the first Canadian to be issued a pilot's license and the following year, he made the first flight from Florida to Cuba. For the next few years, he continued to set aviation records in Canada and North America, until 1916, when vision problems grounded him.

First World War 
In 1915, McCurdy established the first aviation school in Canada, the Curtiss Flying School, operating from 1915 to 1919, and was the first manager of Long Branch Aerodrome, Canada's first airport. He was also instrumental in setting up Canadian Aeroplanes Ltd., an aircraft manufacturing company located in Toronto, Ontario, Canada that built aircraft for the Royal Flying Corps during the First World War. Formed on 15 December 1916, when the Imperial Munitions Board bought the Curtiss (Canada) aircraft operation in Toronto (opened in 1916 as Toronto Curtiss Aeroplanes), Canadian Aeroplanes Ltd. manufactured the JN-4 (Can) Canuck, the Felixstowe F5L flying boat, and the Avro 504.

Interwar years 
In 1928, McCurdy created the Reid Aircraft Company in Montreal and became its first president. After a merger, he remained at the helm of the Curtiss-Reid Aircraft Company, a position he held until the advent of war. The most notable product of the company was the Curtiss-Reid Rambler.

McCurdy married Margaret Ball of Woodstock, Ontario, daughter of Margaret and Robert N. Ball, Queens Counsel for Sullivan Co, Ontario.

Second World War 
At the beginning of the Second World War, McCurdy became Assistant Director General of Aircraft Production. He remained in that position until 1947.

Postwar 
In 1947, McCurdy was appointed Lieutenant Governor of Nova Scotia, a post he continued until 1952. He was awarded the McKee Trophy in 1959 on the 50th anniversary of the flight of the Silver Dart. He attended official ceremonies and sat in the replica Silver Dart built for the occasion. He was also named an honorary air commodore at the time.

After a lengthy illness, McCurdy died in 1961 in Montreal, Quebec, and was buried the following month in Baddeck, Nova Scotia where a family home had been maintained.

Legacy 
The McCurdy Award at McGill University in Montreal was introduced in 1954 by the Institute of Aircraft Technicians. The award commemorates the contributions made by John A.D. McCurdy during the development of the aviation industry in North America. Following its creation in 1973, McCurdy was inducted into Canada's Aviation Hall of Fame.

On 27 July 2009 Sydney Airport was renamed J.A. Douglas McCurdy Sydney Airport in his honour. In 2012, he was inducted into the Canadian Science and Engineering Hall of Fame.

Awards and recognition

See also 
 Adventurers' Club of New York

References 
Notes

Citations

Bibliography

 "Aerial Experimental Association (AEA)". Aerofiles.  Retrieved: 19 May 2005.
 Blanchard, H. Percy. "Family Tree Reference 2A73." The McCurdys of Nova Scotia: Genealogical Record & Biographical Sketches of the McCurdys of Nova Scotia. Halifax: Hon. F. B. McCurdy, 1930.
 Green, H. Gordon. The Silver Dart: The Authentic Story of the Hon. J.A.D. McCurdy, Canada's First Pilot. Fredericton, New Brunswick: Atlantic Advocate Book, 1959.
 Gunston, Bill. World Encyclopedia of Aircraft Manufacturers. Annapolis, Maryland: Naval Institute Press, 1993. .
 Harding, Les. McCurdy and the Silver Dart. Sydney, Nova Scotia, Canada: University of Cape Breton Press, 1998. .
 "John A.D. McCurdy." Canada's Digital Collections. Retrieved: 5 August 2005.
 Milberry, Larry. Aviation in Canada: The Pioneer Decades, Vol. 1. Toronto: CANAV Books, 2008. .
 Molson, Ken M. and Harold A. Taylor. Canadian Aircraft Since 1909. Stittsville, Ontario: Canada's Wings, Inc., 1982. 
 Taylor, Michael J.H. Jane's Encyclopedia of Aviation. London: Studio Editions, 1989. .

External links 

 CBC 1949 radio archive
 J.A.D. McCurdy and the Silver Dart: Canada's First Aerial Navigator at Nova Scotia Archives & Records Management
 Photograph of J.A.D. McCurdy memorial plaque by the Historic Sites and Monuments Board

1886 births
1961 deaths
Canadian mechanical engineers
Canadian Presbyterians
University of Toronto alumni
St. Andrew's College (Aurora) alumni
Canadian aviators
Aviation history of Canada
Members of the Early Birds of Aviation
Lieutenant Governors of Nova Scotia
Canadian people of Scottish descent
Canadian Aviation Hall of Fame inductees
Persons of National Historic Significance (Canada)
People from Baddeck, Nova Scotia
Honorary air commodores
Canadian aviation record holders